George Fredrick Blackburn (3 August 1899 – 7 March 1957) was a footballer in the early years of professional football in England. A left-half, he made over 250 appearances in the Football League during his career and won one cap for England in May 1924.

Early life
Blackburn was born in Willesden and lived in Sandringham Road as a child, attending Pound Lane School. He was one of six children. His father was a brass finisher.

Club career
Blackburn started his career at Hampstead Town, now known as Hendon. He signed for Aston Villa as an amateur in December 1920 and went on to play over 100 games, including their 2–0 defeat to Newcastle United in the 1924 FA Cup Final. He left Villa in June 1926 in a swap deal which saw Joe Nicholson join Villa and Blackburn join Cardiff City. He made his debut for Cardiff in a 4–3 defeat to Burnley and went on to establish himself in the side, although he was not included in the squad when the side won the FA Cup in 1927. His only goal for the club came in February 1930 when he scored against Blackpool during a 4–2 win. He left the club in 1931, along with Harry Wake, to join Mansfield Town. He later went to play and coach Cheltenham Town from 1932 to 1934.

International career
Blackburn received his first call up to the England national side in April 1924 for a match against Scotland in the 1923–24 British Home Championship but did not feature for the side. One month later, on 17 May 1924, Blackburn made his one and only appearance for England in a 3–1 victory over France at Stade Pershing.

After his retirement, Blackburn became a trainer at Birmingham City during the Second World War and was handed control of the first team training duties by secretary-manager Bill Camkin toward the end of his spell in charge.

Honours
Aston Villa
FA Cup: runner-up 1924

Cardiff City
FA Charity Shield - 1927
Welsh Cup: - 1927, 1930; runner-up 1929

References

1899 births
1957 deaths
English footballers
Association football midfielders
England international footballers
English Football League players
Aston Villa F.C. players
Cardiff City F.C. players
Cheltenham Town F.C. players
Cheltenham Town F.C. non-playing staff
Hendon F.C. players
Mansfield Town F.C. players
FA Cup Final players